This is a list of cities and towns in Eswatini. The table below also includes the population and region information.

List

References 
 Swaziland Government - The Central Statistical Office
 CityPopulation.de - Historical populations of the cities of Swaziland

 
Eswatini
Eswatini
Cities